"Someone, Someone" is a song by American rock and roll band the Crickets, released in March 1959 as the B-side to "Love's Made a Fool of You". However, the song is better known for the version by British beat group Brian Poole and the Tremeloes, which became a top-ten hit in the UK in 1964.

Background and release
"Someone, Someone" was written by Violet Ann "Vi" Petty, wife of the Crickets' producer Norman Petty, and Edwin Greines, who had previously co-written "Mr. Success", a minor hit for Frank Sinatra in 1958. It was recorded by the Crickets in their second recording session following the departure of Buddy Holly. The recording took place in November 1958 at Norman Petty's Recording Studios in Clovis, New Mexico, and featured two new members: lead vocalist Earl Sinks and guitarist Sonny Curtis. Vi Petty also featured playing piano, and the backing vocals were provided by the Roses. "Someone, Someone" was released in March 1959 as the B-side to "Love's Made a Fool of You", which failed to chart in the US, though was a minor hit in the UK. Reviewed in Billboard, "Someone, Someone" was described as having a "soft chant on a pounding ballad with beat… [with] danceable rhythm and good vocal".

Personnel
 Earl Sinks – lead vocals
 Sonny Curtis – guitar
 Joe Mauldin – bass
 Jerry Allison – drums
 Violet Ann Petty – piano
 The Roses (Robert Linville, Ray Rush, David Bingham) – backing vocals

Brian Poole and the Tremeloes version

Recording and release
Brian Poole and the Tremeloes had been in contact with Norman Petty since the late 1950s and he sent the group a number of songs, including "Someone, Someone". Petty was also present at the recording at Decca Studios. He insisted that the song had to be sung "softly and with feeling", yet having been recently on tour for ages, with lead singer Brian Poole saying that "so soft singing had kind of rasped out a little". In order to counter this, Petty got Poole to sing whilst lying down in the recording booth, causing everyone to start laughing. However, the recording was successful and it was later released as a single in May 1964 with the B-side, "Till the End of Time", written by Poole and guitarist Alan Blakley. "Someone, Someone" represented a divergence from their previous beat songs like "Do You Love Me" and "Candy Man", instead showcasing a pop ballad style, with Poole saying at the time that "it's given us a great kick to do a number like this, just for contrast, but we'll probably be back to the uptempo stuff next time". It became the group's fourth and final UK top-ten hit, peaking at number 2 on the four major music paper charts at the time, and their only to make the US charts, before the departure of Brian Poole in 1966. "Someone, Someone" sold over 250,000 copies and was awarded a silver disc by Disc. The song was later included on the group's album It's About Time, released in April 1965.

Reception
Reviewing for Disc, Don Nicholl wrote that "Brian sings "Someone, Someone" with a soft wistful manner that is very appealing. A definite contrast to their previous beat work this half could be a top seller. Group echo his words tenderly and the guitar backing is class, simple". In Record Mirror, the reviewer wrote that "It grows and grows... pleasant tune, good singing, nice "answer" bits from the group".

Charts

References

1959 songs
1959 singles
1964 singles
The Crickets songs
The Tremeloes songs
Song recordings produced by Norman Petty
Song recordings produced by Mike Smith (British record producer)
Brunswick Records singles
Decca Records singles